The Really Nasty Horse Racing Game is a board game combining luck and tactics. It was designed by Simon Knock in 1987.

Contents
The game set consists of an oversized game board, bookmaker's board, betting slips, deck of specials cards, stack of money, dice, and six large plastic horses-and-jockeys and other items.  Each player is assigned a horse and races it around the track by rolling a single die. Players can bet on another player's horse, and are issued cards which allow them to commit dirty tricks, for instance making a horse fall or forcing the winner to take a drug test.

Reception
Brian Walker reviewed The Really Nasty Horse Racing Game for Games International magazine, and gave it 3 stars out of 5, and stated that "Undemanding families will no doubt enjoy it as it is, and for collectors, well, this will definitely go on top of the heap."

References

Board games introduced in 1987